The year 1954 in television involved some significant events. Below is a list of television-related events in 1954.



Events
January 1 – NBC broadcasts the Rose Parade from Pasadena, California in NTSC color.  The broadcast uses a new mobile color TV studio (truck) and the program is carried across the continent on 21 stations.  RCA strategically places Color TV sets in public viewing areas such as hotel lobbies because the first sets only become available to the public in the spring.
January 3 – Programma Nazionale began transmissions in Italy, making it the very first TV network in Italian television.
January 5 – WAYS-TV, predecessor of WCCB, signed on the air. It was North Carolina's second UHF station (after WNAO-TV in Raleigh), as well as the second television station in the Charlotte market.
January 10 – CBMT opens in Montreal, making that city the first in Canada to have 2 stations operating. The new station uses the English language, leaving CBFT to continue entirely in French.
January 11 – The first weather forecast with an in-vision presenter is televised in the UK.
January 12 - Experimental television began in Norway.
March 28 – WKAQ-TV became the first television station in Puerto Rico.
April – The American Broadcasting Company broadcasts the Army-McCarthy hearings live and in their entirety.
May 1 – WAPA-TV becomes the second television station in Puerto Rico.
May 1 – Télévision suisse romande TSR was launched as the very first Italian broadcaster in Switzerland.
May 17–23 – One week (the so-called "Sandrewsveckan" or "Sandrews week") of experimental television broadcasts are aired in Sweden, the first such programs in the country.
June 5 – The last new episode of the comic variety program, Your Show of Shows, airs.
June 13 – Canal Nacional, predecessor of Canal 1, launched as the first Colombian television station.
July 5 – First actual news bulletin, News and Newsreel, aired on BBC Television, replacing Television Newsreel.
September 11 – The Miss America Beauty Contest airs for the first time on national television in the United States. 27 million viewers watched as Lee Ann Meriwether wins the title. Meriwether would later become a television actress, co-starring in Barnaby Jones (1973–1980).
September 16 – CBET-DT began transmissions as CKLW-TV at 2:50 p.m., it was the first television station in Windsor.
September 26 – WCAX-TV signs on the air as WMVT, making it the very first television station in Vermont.
October 2 – The Jimmy Durante Show premieres on NBC (1954–1956).
October 29 – Sveriges Radio begins broadcasting TV in Sweden and apart from news and a weather forecast, the first Swedish TV programme is "En skål för televisionen" ("A Toast to Television") led by Lennart Hyland. For the first few months (until spring 1955), Swedish TV is broadcast one evening a week and for about an hour each time.
November 3 – Disney's Alice in Wonderland airs on ABC in the United States.
November 6 – LTV began broadcasting for the very first time in Latvia and the oldest in the Baltic countries.
November 19 – Télé Monte-Carlo launched in Monaco, the first microstate to have a television network.
December 12 – BBC Television broadcasts its famous, and controversial, adaptation of George Orwell's novel Nineteen Eighty-Four.
The Television Act 1954 authorises setting up the infrastructure for British commercial television.
The British Academy Television Awards, the most prestigious awards of the British television industry, are first awarded.
The RCA CT-100 and Westinghouse 15" color sets hit the market. Neither are big sellers.

Programs/programmes

Series on the air in 1954
Adventures of Superman (1952–1958)
American Bandstand (1952–1989)
Bozo the Clown (1949–present)
Buick-Berle Show (1953–1954); the show was renamed The Milton Berle Show (1954–1967) this year
Candid Camera (1948–2014)
Cisco Kid (1950–1956)
The Colgate Comedy Hour (1950-1955)
Come Dancing (UK) (1949–1995)
Death Valley Days (1952–1975)
Dragnet (1951–1959)
General Motors Theatre (Can) (1953–1956, 1958–1961)
Gillette Cavalcade of Sports (1946–1960)
Hallmark Hall of Fame (1951–present)
Hawkins Falls (1950, 1951–1955)
Hockey Night in Canada (1952–present)
Howdy Doody (1947–1960)
I Love Lucy (1951–1960)
Kraft Television Theater (1947–1958)
Kukla, Fran and Ollie (1947–1957)
Life is Worth Living (1952–1957)
Life with Elizabeth (1952–1955)
Love of Life (1951–1980)
Meet the Press (1947–present)
Muffin the Mule (1946–1955)
My Little Margie (1952–1955)
Our Miss Brooks  (1952-1956)
Panorama (UK) (1953–present)
Search for Tomorrow (1951–1986)
The Adventures of Ozzie and Harriet (1952–1966)
The Colgate Comedy Hour (1950-1955)
The Ed Sullivan Show (1948–1971)
The George Burns and Gracie Allen Show (1950–1958)
The Goldbergs (1949–1955)
The Good Old Days (UK) (1953–1983)
The Guiding Light (1952–2009)
The Jack Benny Program (1950–1965)
The Roy Rogers Show (1951–1957)
The Today Show (1952–present)
The Voice of Firestone (1949–1963)
This Is Your Life (US) (1952–1961)
Truth or Consequences (1950–1988)
What's My Line (1950–1967)
Where's Raymond? or The Ray Bolger Show (1953–1955)
Your Hit Parade (1950–1959)

Debuts
January 1 – Annie Oakley (1954–1957)
January 4 – The Brighter Day (1954–1962) 
January 23 – Stories of the Century (1954–1955) 
February 1 - The Secret Storm (1954–1974)
March 11 – The Public Defender on CBS (1954–1955)
April 2 – The Grove Family, on BBC Television (1954–1957); generally considered the first British TV soap opera
April 8 – Justice on NBC (1954–1956)
April 18 – The Martha Wright Show on ABC
April 26 – The Tony Martin Show on NBC
July 5 - Concerning Miss Marlowe on NBC.
July 16 - The Best in Mystery on NBC. (1954)
August 5 – So You Want to Lead a Band on ABC (1954–1955)
August 28 – The Mickey Rooney Show: Hey, Mulligan on NBC (1954–1955)
September 7 
Stop the Music premiered for the second time on ABC after a two-year hiatus
It's a Great Life on NBC (1954–1956)
September 10 – Dear Phoebe on NBC (1954–1955)
September 12 – Lassie on CBS (1954–1973)
September 18 – Willy on CBS (1954–1955)
September 27 – The Tonight Show on NBC (1954–present)
October 2 
The Imogene Coca Show on NBC (1954–1955)
The Jimmy Durante Show on NBC (1954–1956)
October 3 - Father Knows Best on CBS (1954-60)
October 5 - The Elgin Hour on ABC (1954-1955)
October 7 – The Mail Story, subtitled Handle with Care, on ABC (1954)
October 14 – Flash Gordon (1954–1955), starring Steve Holland
October 15 – The Adventures of Rin Tin Tin on ABC (1954–1959)
October 21 – The CBS anthology series, Climax! (1954–1958) airs an adaptation of Ian Fleming's novel, Casino Royale, starring Barry Nelson as an Americanized version of spy James Bond; the first dramatic adaptation of a Bond novel
October 22 - The Jack Carson Show on NBC (1954-1955)
October 27 – The Walt Disney anthology series debuts as Disneyland (1954–present; as Disneyland 1954–1958)
November 13 – Fabian of the Yard, the first British TV police procedural, debuts on BBC (1954–1956)
December 21 – Zoo Quest on BBC Television (1954–1964)
Face the Nation on CBS (1954–present)
The Jo Stafford Show, a 15-minute primetime variety series, on CBS (1954–1955)
The National premieres as The National News on CBC (1954–present)
That's My Boy on CBS

Ending this year

Births

Deaths

References